FUB-PB-22 (QUFUBIC) is an indole-based synthetic cannabinoid that is a potent agonist of the CB1 receptor and has been sold online as a designer drug.

Pharmacology
FUB-PB-22 acts as a full agonist with a binding affinity of 0.386nM at CB1 and 0.478nM at CB2 cannabinoid receptors.

Legal status 

FUB-PB-22 is an Anlage II controlled substance in Germany. It was scheduled in Japan in July 2014.

As of October 2015 FUB-PB-22 is a controlled substance in China.

It is also banned in Sweden.

See also 

 2F-QMPSB
 5F-PB-22
 AM-2201
 BB-22
 FUB-JWH-018
 AB-FUBINACA
 ADB-FUBINACA
 AMB-FUBINACA
 FDU-PB-22
 FUB-144
 FUB-APINACA
 MDMB-FUBICA
 MDMB-FUBINACA
 PB-22

References 

Cannabinoids
Designer drugs
Fluoroarenes
Indolecarboxylates